Babak Fahimi from the University of Texas at Dallas, Richardson, Texas was named Fellow of the Institute of Electrical and Electronics Engineers (IEEE) in 2015 for "contributions to modeling and analysis of AC adjustable speed motor drives".

In 2017, Fahimi was awarded the Distinguished Chair in Engineering from the University of Texas at Dallas.

References

External links

20th-century births
Living people
University of Texas at Dallas faculty
Fellow Members of the IEEE
Year of birth missing (living people)
Place of birth missing (living people)
American electrical engineers